Heinz Winbeck (11 February 1946 – 26 March 2019) was a German composer, conductor and academic teacher. He is known for five large-scale symphonies, which he programmatically subtitled, such as "Tu Solus" and "De Profundis". As a composition teacher in Würzburg, he shaped a generation of students.

Career 
Winbeck was born in a small village named Piflas, now part of Ergolding, close to Landshut in Lower Bavaria, into a family of farmers. He started his musical studies in 1964 at the Richard Strauss Conservatory in Munich: piano with Magda Rusy and conducting with Fritz Rieger. From 1967 he studied conducting at the Musikhochschule München with Jan Koetsier and composition with Harald Genzmer and Günter Bialas, graduating with the Staatsexamen (State Exam) in 1973. After his studies, he was encouraged especially by Wilhelm Killmayer to find his personal style. Like Wolfgang Rihm and Manfred Trojahn, he turned to a Neue Einfachheit (New simplicity) and subjectivity.

From 1974 to 1978 he worked as a composer and conductor at the Stadttheater Ingolstadt, also for the festival . In 1980 he taught at the Musikhochschule München. In 1981 he studied for half a year at the Cité internationale des arts in Paris on a scholarship from the State of Bavaria. In 1987 he taught ear training and music theory at the Musikhochschule München. In 1988 he was appointed professor of composition at the Hochschule für Musik Würzburg. Winbeck was composer in residence at the Cabrillo Festival of Contemporary Music in Cabrillo, California.

From 1991 Winbeck lived in Schambach near Riedenburg in Lower Bavaria, in a monastery that he and his wife Gerlinde modernized. He died on 26 March 2019 in a clinic in Regensburg. The CD box "Heinz Winbeck – The Complete Symphonies" published by the TYXart records label in 2019 was awarded the OPUS Klassik in August 2020, in the categories "Symphonic recording of the 20th / 21st century", "Editorial performance of the year" and "World premiere recording of the year", nominated and awarded the OPUS Klassik for the "world premiere recording" at the beginning of September 2020.

Symphonies 
Winbeck revived the genre of the symphony, motivated by the need for existential expression. He composed five large-scale symphonies between 1983 and 2011, comparable to the symphonies of Gustav Mahler. By giving them titles, he reflected topics such as history as a sequence of wars and cruelty, the guilt of the generation of his parents, endangered ecology, the loneliness of humanity in the cosmos, and facing near-death.

Winbeck's First Symphony was premiered in 1984 at the Donaueschinger Tage für Neue Musik and recorded by WERGO, combined with Winbeck's second string quartet, with Dennis Russell Davies conducting the Rundfunk-Sinfonieorchester Saarbrücken. Winbeck's Fifth Symphony "Jetzt und in der Stunde des Todes" (Now and in the hour of death) reflects sketches of Anton Bruckner's unfinished 9th Symphony. The work in three movements of about 55 minutes was played by the Bruckner Orchestra Linz, conducted by Dennis Russell Davies on 1 March 2010 at the Stift St. Florian. The same year Winbeck started a collaboration with the Landestheater Linz, which resulted in the ballet "Lebensstürme" (Storms of life).

The composer commented on his way of composing:

Works 
Winbeck's works are published by Bärenreiter.

Vocal
 Glühende Rätsel (Glowing enigmas) (1970), song cycle for baritone and piano, Text: Nelly Sachs

Symphonic works
 Sonoscillant (1971), music for cello and string orchestra
 Entgegengesang (1973), for orchestra
 Lenau-Fantasien (1979), for cello and orchestra
 Denk ich an Haydn (1982), three fragments for orchestra
 Tu Solus (You alone), First Symphony (1983/85)
 Second Symphony (1985/86)
 Grodek, Third Symphony (1987/88), for orchestra, alto and speaker, text: Georg Trakl
 De Profundis (Out of the deep, Psalm 130), Fourth Symphony 
 Jetzt und in der Stunde des Todes (Now and in the hour of death, from the Ave Maria), Fifth Symphony

Chamber music
 Pas de deux (1971) for flute and xylophon
 Tempi capricciosi, First String Quartet (1979)
 Tempi notturni, Second String Quartet (1979)
 Blick in den St.&nrom (1982) for 2 violins, viola and 2 cellos
 Jagdquartett (Hunting quartet), Third String Quartet (1984)

Awards 
 1974: First prize in the First composition competition of the Sommerliche Musiktage Hitzacker (Summer Music Days)
 1980: Second prize in the Fourth composition competition in Hitzacker
 1981: Grant award of the city of Munich
 1981/82: scholarship by State of Bavaria for studies of half a year at the Cité internationale des arts
 1985: Music prize of the Berliner Kunstpreis
 2004: "Gerda-und-Günter-Bialas-Award" of the GEMA Foundation
 2010 Friedrich-Baur-Preis
 2020 OPUS Klassik

In 1994 Heinz and Gerhilde Winbeck won a prize for the historical renovation by the Hypo-Foundation.

Publications 

 
 Daniel Hensel, "Heinz Winbeck", in: Komponisten der Gegenwart, Edition text + kritik München, 65. Nachlieferung, 12/2019.(in German)
 Wilhelm Killmayer, Musik als Natur. Zur Kompositionsweise von Heinz Winbeck. Zum einstimmigen Melos im Streichquintett "Blick in den Strom", in: Melos. Vierteljahreszeitschrift für Musik, 1984, H. 1, p. 70–81.(in German)
 Franz Hummel, Heinz Winbecks apokalyptische Volksmusik, in: Text zur LP Col legno 5517, 1987.(in German)
 Siegfried Mauser: Musik als Natur. Zur Kompositionsweise von Heinz Winbeck. Zur Klangschichten-Komposition in den »Lenau-Fantasien", in: Melos. Vierteljahreszeitschrift für Musik, 1984, H. 1, p. 62–70.(in German)
 Michael Töpel, "Heinz Winbeck", in: MGG, Supplement, Kassel 22008, 1132–1134.(in German)
 Winbeck, Prof. Heinz. In: Wilfried W. Bruchhäuser: Komponisten der Gegenwart im Deutschen Komponisten-Interessenverband. Ein Handbuch. 4. Auflage, Deutscher Komponisten-Interessenverband, Berlin 1995, p. 1393.(in German)

Discography 

 Heinz Winbeck – The Complete Symphonies, 2019 TYXart, TXA17091, LC28001
 Heinz Winbeck – Erste Sinfonie Tu Solus, Zweites Streichquartett tempi notturni, 1990, WERGO 6509 2, LC 8046
 Heinz Winbeck – Denk Ich An Haydn / Entgegengesang, LP, 1982, col legno – 5517, LC 7989
 J. F. Kleinknecht*, H. Winbeck*, P. Engel* / Münchener Kammerorchester – Fest-Konzert, "Lenau-Fantasien", 1980, Bayerische Vereinsbank, A-5580 A-1/80S

References

External links 
 
 Winbeck, Prof. Heinz German composers association
 
 Heinz Winbeck / Erste Sinfonie Tu Solus / Zweites Streichquartett tempi notturni Deutscher Musikrat
 Heinz Winbeck und Philipp Maintz bei "Ultraschall" in Berlin Takte February 2016
 Trauer um Komponisten von Weltrang Donaukurier 27 March 2019
 Prof. Heinz Winbeck verstorben Musikhochschule Würzburg

1946 births
2019 deaths
People from Landshut (district)
German classical composers
Ballet composers
Academic staff of the Hochschule für Musik Würzburg
20th-century classical composers
21st-century classical composers
University of Music and Performing Arts Munich alumni
German male classical composers
20th-century German composers
21st-century German composers
20th-century German male musicians
21st-century German male musicians